Nahida is a genus of butterfly.

Nahida may also refer to:
Nahida Akter (born 2000), Bangladeshi cricketer
Nahida Khan (born 1986), Pakistani cricketer
Nahida Ruth Lazarus (born 1849), German–Jewish author and scholar
Nahida Nakad (born 1960), Lebanese and Italian TV reporter and journalist
Nahida Sobhan, Bangladeshi diplomat
Nahida Touhami (born 1978), Algerian middle distance runner

See also
Anahita (disambiguation)
Nahid (disambiguation)